The Conquest of America is a name given to the European colonization of the Americas.

The term may also refer to:
 Conquest of America (miniseries), a 2005 TV miniseries
 The Conquest of America: The Question of the Other, a 1982 book by Tzvetan Todorov
 Conquest of America, a play-by-mail game by Agents of Gaming later renamed to Continental Conquest.